Terrible was originally a 74-gun ship of the line of the French Navy launched in 1739. Captured on 14 October 1747, she was taken into  Royal Navy service as the third rate HMS Terrible.

Design and construction
Terrible was laid down at Toulon in November 1736 to a design by François Coulomb the Younger.  This ship significantly modified the existing 74-gun concept with a longer hull, enabling the fitting of an extra pair of guns on both the lower and upper decks, compared with previous 74s. This initially raised the number of guns to 78 in wartime (70 in peacetime), but in 1744 the four small 4-pounder guns on the poop were deleted (as ineffective). This ordnance layout was to become the standard pattern for all French 74-gun ships for the next half century. Launched on 19 December 1739, she was completed the following year.

French career and capture
Terrible took part in the Battle of Toulon on 22 February 1744, as the flagship of Capitaine de Vaisseau Charles-Élisée Court de la Bruyère. On 17 October 1746 she captured the British 50-gun  in the English Channel. She served with the French fleet at the Second Battle of Cape Finisterre, under Chef d'Escadre Henri-François des Herbiers, Marquis de l'Étenduère, on 25 October 1747, and was one of the French ships captured by the British fleet, under Admiral Sir Edward Hawke.

British career

Terrible was brought into Portsmouth and surveyed there in June 1748. The Navy Board authorised her purchase on 30 September 1748, paying a total of £11,211.11.0d, once a sum had been abated for repairs. A small repair was carried out at Portsmouth for £7,024.18.6d between April and August 1750, and she was fitted out for service in 1753. She was commissioned in May that year as the Portsmouth guardship, under the command of Captain Robert Pett. and with Samuel Hood as an officer. She passed to Captain Philip Durell in March 1755, and later was under Captain William Holborne, while serving as the flagship of Rear-Admiral Francis Holburne. Terrible was sent as a reinforcement for Vice-Admiral Edward Boscawen in May 1755, and was despatched again in April 1756, this time to reinforce Vice-Admiral Edward Hawke. Captain Richard Collins took command of her later in 1756, and in the summer of that year Terrible went out to join Boscawen's fleet.

She went out to North America in April 1757, and was present at the Siege of Louisbourg in 1758. She returned to North America in early 1759, being at the assault on Quebec in 1759.  She returned to Britain after this, and was surveyed on 1 April 1760. An admiralty order was issued on 31 December 1762, instructing her to be broken up. She was broken up at Chatham, a process completed by 16 February 1763.

See also
 List of ships captured in the 18th century

Notes

References

External links
 

Ships of the line of the Royal Navy
Ships built in France
1730s ships
Captured ships